This is a list of notable breakfast foods from A to Z. Breakfast is the meal taken after rising from a night's sleep, most often eaten in the early morning before undertaking a day's work. Among English speakers, breakfast can be used to refer to this meal or to refer to a meal composed of traditional breakfast foods such as eggs and much more. Breakfast foods are prepared with a multitude of ingredients, including oats, wheat, maize, barley, noodles, starches, eggs, and meats.

Breakfast foods

A

 Ackee and saltfish – the national dish of Jamaica

B

 
 
 
 
 
 
 
 Banana in Jamaican cuisine, boiled green bananas are served as a breakfast side dish.
 Banana bread
 Barley honeya Japanese product prepared with barley starch, typically combined with rice flour
 
 
 Bhatoorafluffy deep-fried leavened bread from northern India
 
  Biscuits and gravy
 
 
 
 
 
 
 
 
 
 
 
 
 
 

 Bubur kacang hijau – a common porridge and typical breakfast dish in Indonesia, made from mung beans, coconut milk and sugar.

C

 Calas a breakfast food in New Orleans
 
 
 
 
 
 
 
 
 
 
 

 Coffee cake

 
 Conecuh sausage, waffle-wrapped sausage on a stick invented in Alabama
 
 Cottage cheese
 Creamed eggs on toast
 Crêpe
 Cretons
 Croissant
Crumpet
Cuban bread

D

E

F

 
 
Foul – An Egyptian and Middle Eastern dish made with cooked fava beans flavored with lemon juice, garlic and served with olive oil, chopped parsley & tomatoes.
 
 
 Fried cheese – served as a breakfast dish in Cyprus, Greece, Lebanon, Syria and Turkey
 Fried chicken – Consumed as a breakfast food by some in Perth, Western Australia

G

H

 Halwa poori
 Ham
 Ham and eggs – has been described as a staple of "an old-fashioned American breakfast" and of the traditional English breakfast
 Hamburger
 Hangtown Fry
 Hash
 Hash browns
 Home fries
 Huevos divorciadosa Mexican breakfast dish that consists of two fried eggs, chilaquiles and salsa. Typically, one egg is covered in salsa roja, while the other is covered in salsa verde, giving them distinct and complementary flavors.
 Huevos motuleños
 Huevos pericos
 Huevos rancheros

I
 Idli – consumed as a breakfast food in Southern India
 Instant breakfast
 Irish soda bread

J

K

 
 
 
 
 
 
 
 
 Kulcha a breakfast staple in Pakistan

L
 
 
 
 
 
 Lox  a fillet of brined salmon

M

 Malasadas
 ManakishLevantine dish similar to pizza and often eaten at breakfast.
 Mandocausually served at breakfast in Venezuela
 Maple syrup
 Mas hunia breakfast dish in the Maldives.
 Matzah breia Ashkenazi Passover breakfast
 Maypo
 McGriddles
 McMuffin
 Meeshay
 Menemen
 Mie goreng
 Migas
 Milk toast
 Mohingaa breakfast food in Burma
 Monkey bread
 Msemen – a common breakfast dish in Morocco
 Muesli
 Muffin
 Mugoyo

N

 Nasi gorenga breakfast dish in Indonesia, Malaysia and Singapore
 Nasi lemaka breakfast dish in Malaysia and Singapore
 Nattōa Japanese breakfast dish

O
 Oatmeal
 Omelette
 Omurice
 Ontbijtkoek
 Orange juice
 Ox-tongue pastry
 Oysters Rockefeller

P

 Pain au chocolat
 Pain aux raisins
 Palm syrup
 Palmier
 Pan de yucaserved for breakfast or with tea in Bolivia
 Pancake
 Pandebonoa breakfast food in Colombia

 Pandesala common Philippine breakfast bread
 Pastry
 Paczki
 Peanut butter
 Pebete
 Pear
 Pekmez
 Perico
 Pesarattua breakfast crepe from Andhra Pradesh, India made with green gram
 Phittia hunza bread that is a common breakfast food
 Pisca Andina
 Poached egg
 Poha
 Pop-Tarts
 Popcorn cerealpopcorn with milk and a sweetener; consumed by Americans in the 1800s
 Popover
 Pork brains and eggs
 Pork rolla staple of New Jersey since 1856. Today it is traditionally served with egg and cheese on a hard roll and topped with salt, pepper, and ketchup. In North Jersey all pork roll may be referred to by the brand "Taylor Ham".
 Porridge
 Portuguese sweet bread
 Potato cake
 Potato pancake 
 Potato scone
 Potatoes O'Brien 
 Protein bar
 Pumpkin bread
 Puttu

Q 

 Quiche
 Quick bread

R
 Raisin bran
 Raisin bread
 Reindeer meat
Rice
 Rolled oats
 Roti canai
 Roti prata
 Run downa traditional Jamaican breakfast dish prepared with salt mackerel, coconut milk, tomato and various vegetable and spices

S

 
 
 
 
 
 
 
 
 
 
 
 
 
 Simit a Turkish snack bread and breakfast food 
 
 Slinger a breakfast food that originated in St. Louis, Missouri

 
 Soft-boiled eggs

T

 Tacos
 Tamago kake gohana Japanese breakfast food consisting of cooked rice topped or mixed with raw egg, and optionally, soy sauce
TapsilogA Filipino dish consisting in marinated beef cuts, egg and fried rice. Is usually accompanied by slices of onions, tomatoes and cucumbers.
 Taylor ham
 Teacake
 Texas toast
 Throdkin
 Tian moa traditional breakfast soup from the city of Jinan in the Shandong province of China; made of millet powder, peanuts, vermicelli, cowpea, spiced tofu (or shredded tofu skin), and spinach
 Toast
 Toaster Strudels
 Tomato omelette
 Tongue
 Tongue toast
 Touton
 Tripe

U
Upma dosa

V

W

 
 
 
 Wrap rotiin Thailand, roti is often eaten for breakfast dipped in sauces.

X

Y

Z

See also

 History of breakfast
 List of breakfast beverages
 List of breakfast cereals
 List of breakfast topics
 List of brunch foods

Notes

References

Bibliography
 Wiley, Harvey Washington (1917).  Foods and their adulteration. P. Blakiston's Son & Co. pp. 267–269.

External links

 MacMillan, Amanda (June 1, 2013). "Top 20 Foods to Eat for Breakfast". ABC News.
 Thomson, Julie R. (Updated: October 1, 2013). "The Best Breakfast Foods, In Order". Huffington Post.
 Mathews, Jeena (Jan 12, 2017). "Top 10 Healthy Breakfast Ideas to keep you Fit and Energetic". Healthy Mortal.
 AFP (April 3, 2012). "List of breakfast foods low in glycemic index; foods help you avoid blood sugar spikes". NY Daily News.
 (Ask Men) (April 8, 2012). "5 worst breakfast foods". Fox News.

Breakfast
 List of breakfast foods